Randolph Bowe (December 18, 1918 – July 19, 2016), nicknamed "Lefty" and "Bob", was an American Negro league pitcher from 1938 to 1940.

A native of Amandaville, Kentucky, Bowe made his Negro leagues debut in 1938 with the Kansas City Monarchs. He played for the Chicago American Giants in 1939 and 1940, and was selected to play in the 1940 East–West All-Star Game, but declined due to a salary dispute. Bowe died in Erie, Pennsylvania, in 2016 at age 97.

References

External links
 and Seamheads

1918 births
2016 deaths
Chicago American Giants players
Indianapolis Clowns players
Kansas City Monarchs players
20th-century African-American sportspeople
Baseball pitchers
21st-century African-American people